Song for the New Man is an album by saxophonist David "Fathead" Newman which was recorded in 2003 and released on the HighNote label early the following year.

Reception

In his review on Allmusic, Scott Yanow states "At the age of 70, veteran tenor saxophonist David "Fathead" Newman is in prime form throughout this well-rounded set. ... Highly recommended to straight-ahead jazz fans, this set shows that David "Fathead" Newman, who has had a diverse career, is at heart a big-toned swinger in the tradition of Gene Ammons". In JazzTimes, Michael Edwards noted "Song for the New Man is a forthright rebuttal to the notion that an album with no overriding theme, no avant-garde experimentation and no scale-beating vocalist will be humdrum. This is hugely satisfying jazz playing with a verve and polish all its own". On All About Jazz, Joel Roberts said "his latest effort shows that while he’s mellowed a bit as he’s aged, he hasn’t lost a step. It’s the combination of bluesy grit and post bop polish that gives Newman’s tenor sax playing its special allure, and both are on display on Song for the New Man"

Track listing 
All compositions by David "Fathead" Newman except where noted
 "Visa" (Charlie Parker) – 3:17
 "Time After Time" (Jule Styne, Sammy Cahn) – 4:58	
 "Shakabu" – 4:08
 "Song for the New Man" (Pat Rebillot) – 5:36
 "Passing Through" (Herbie Mann) – 8:58
 "Fast Lane" – 4:15
 "Lonesome Head" – 4:33
 "When I Fall in Love" (Victor Young, Edward Heyman) – 11:26	
 "This I Dig of You" (Hank Mobley) – 5:59

Personnel 
David "Fathead" Newman – tenor saxophone, flute
Curtis Fuller – trombone (tracks 1, 3 & 6-9)
John Hicks – piano 
John Menegon – bass 
Jimmy Cobb – drums

References 

David "Fathead" Newman albums
2004 albums
HighNote Records albums
Albums recorded at Van Gelder Studio